Donald Jerome Mitchell (May 8, 1923 – September 27, 2003) represented New York in the United States House of Representatives from 1973 to 1983.

Early life 

Donald J. "Don" Mitchell, a native of Central Upstate New York's Mohawk Valley, with ancestral family roots tracing back to the American Revolution, was born in Ilion, New York, in 1923.

The oldest child of Donald J. Mitchell and Winnifred Packard Mitchell of Herkimer, New York, he attended the Herkimer Public School System, graduating in 1940 from Herkimer High School, which had been founded in 1899.

In 1945, after returning home from his military service during World War II, Mitchell married Margaretta "Gretta" Wilson LeVee, the daughter of E. Allen LeVee and Margaret Tinker LeVee, of Little Falls, New York.

Married for over 57 years at the time of the Congressman's death in 2003, the Mitchells had three children – Gretchen, Cynthia, and Allen – and two grandchildren, Susan and Lisa.

Military service 

During World War II, Mitchell served as a carrier-based fighter pilot in the United States Navy from 1942 until 1945. An avid pilot in private life, Dr. Mitchell re-enlisted in the Navy in 1951, and served as a Naval Flight Instructor in Pensacola, Florida, from 1951–1953, during the Korean War.

Professional career / Civic service 
Following his military service in World War II, Mitchell completed a bachelor's degree in Optometry at Hobart College in 1949, and earned a master's degree from Columbia University in 1950. In the early 1950s he founded an optometry practice in Herkimer, New York.

In 1954, he was elected to the Herkimer City Council (1954–1957), and served as Mayor of Herkimer from 1957 to 1960.  He was also active in numerous civic and charitable organizations. Among those were: the Boy Scouts of America, the American Civil Defense Association, the Central Association for the Blind, the Eastern New York Chapter of the Nature Conservancy, the Mohawk Valley Chapter of the American Red Cross, the American Cancer Society, the United Way, and the Herkimer County Historical Society. Additionally, he served as a member of the Herkimer Zoning Board of Appeals from 1963 until 1964, until elected to the New York State Assembly.

NY State Assembly 
In 1964, Mitchell was elected to represent Herkimer County in the New York State Assembly.

He was a member of the State Assembly from 1965 to 1972, serving in the 175th, 176th, 177th, 178th and 179th New York State Legislatures. He served in the Republican leadership as the Assembly's Majority Whip from 1969 to 1972.

United States Congress 

In 1972, Mitchell was elected to the United States Congress where he represented what is now New York's 31st Congressional District. After being successfully re-elected to a second term by a wide margin in 1974, he then ran unopposed to for three more terms, serving in Congress a total of 10 years from January 3, 1973, until January 3, 1983.

While in the U.S. Congress, Mitchell served on the House Armed Services Committee, and was elected by his colleagues and served four years in the House Republican Leadership as Regional Whip for New England and the Mid-Atlantic States.

Mitchell was also a founder of, and the first Chairman of the Northeast/Midwest Coalition in the U.S. House of Representatives, and was a founding member of the Congressional Tourism Caucus.

Central NY State Tourism / Economic Development 

Among his other accomplishments as a Member of Congress, he was responsible for establishing Leatherstocking Country, a nine-county tourism district in Central New York state, and played a key role in the House in establishing Fort Stanwix National Monument as a unit of the National Park System.

Griffiss AFB 
He and a coalition of other House members also started a campaign in the early 1970s to persuade the Defense Department to award more military contracts and employ more people in the Northeast, which was losing Defense funding and contracts to the South. And in 1974, Mitchell led another successful campaign to prevent the Air Force from cutting 1,500 jobs at the Rome Air Development Center at Griffiss Air Force Base in Rome, NY

"Save the Theatres" Effort 

In 1982, at the behest of Broadway Producer Joe Papp, and with the encouragement of members of his family and others involved in a "Save the Theatres" effort to preserve historic Broadway theatres in New York City, Mitchell introduced legislation in the Congress along with 13 co-sponsors to designate a "Broadway/Times Square Theatre District National Historic Site" in Mid-Town Manhattan.

Mitchell's bill (97th Congress – H.R.6885) faced fierce opposition and extensive lobbying mounted against it by Mayor Ed Koch's administration and big-money Manhattan development interests. Although the measure was, consequently, never enacted – the overall effect of his legislative initiative and of the "Save the Theatres" effort generally, however, was to slow down the rapid destruction of the old Theater District. This allowed for the preservation of at least some of the historic playhouses, with the eventual designation by the City of an official "Theater Subdistrict", and helped to ensure retention of a measure of the District's original flavor, atmosphere, charm and historic character for future generations of theatregoers and visitors to the City.

As a result in large part to Papp's efforts, with the support of Congressman Mitchell and many others, the Theater District remains one of New York City's primary and most popular tourist attractions and destinations.

Life after Congress / Accolades 

In 1984, Mitchell retired from public service and returned to Herkimer, New York. There he resumed his optometry practice, he and his wife Gretta dividing their time between homes in the Mohawk Valley and in Cedar Key, Florida.

Tributes and awards 
During his long career of military and public service, Mitchell had received many awards and honors.  These included among others the Jimmy Doolittle Fellowship, an award presented by the Aerospace Education Foundation of the Air Force Association; Patriot of the Year, presented by the New York State Reserve Officers Association; and the National Security Award presented by the US Civil Defense Council.

Following his retirement, Mitchell received a number of tributes of various sorts. Among these was the naming in his honor of the Veterans Administration hospital clinic at Griffiss Air Force Base near Rome, New York – which was formally designated by Act of Congress, signed into law by President Clinton, to be known as the "Donald J. Mitchell VA Outpatient Clinic". The facility provides primary care and other health care services for veterans in the greater Utica-Rome-Syracuse area in Central New York State.

A highway bridge over West Canada Creek in the Mohawk Valley just north of the Village of Herkimer was officially designated by Herkimer County in 1988 as the "Donald J. Mitchell Bridge" in his honor.

Donald J. Mitchell Scholarship Fund 
In 1992, Congressman Mitchell and his family established the "Donald J. Mitchell Family Fund", a charitable trust fund administered through the Community Foundation of Herkimer and Oneida Counties based in Utica. The foundation and the Mitchell fund's mission is to build partnerships, inspire leadership and generate positive outcomes toward increasing the percentage of adults with bachelor's degrees in Herkimer and Oneida counties, through annual grants to local students; and to embrace other programs and collaborations that address economic development, education, health, and arts and culture in the region. Since its inception in 1992, the Mitchell Fund has provided Mitchell Scholarship grants each year to student recipients attending Herkimer County Community College and Mohawk Valley Community College.

Death 
Mitchell died on September 27, 2003, of complications associated with Parkinson's disease. Upon his death, the Utica Observer-Dispatch newspaper noted: "If anyone can be heralded for having led an exemplary life, its former U.S. Congressman Donald J. Mitchell.... Mitchell managed to balance a vigorous commitment to community and country without ever forsaking family and friends – and he left a legacy of pride along a path that took him from the Mohawk Valley to the Nation's Capital and back again."

Escorted by both Active Duty, and American Legion Veterans honor guards – and borne by uniform personnel representing all branches of the U.S. Military – Mitchell was interred with full military honors, accompanied by "Taps" and the firing of volley shots, on a hillside at the Oak Hill Cemetery overlooking a tributary of the Mohawk River in his hometown of Herkimer, New York.

Notes

References

External links 

Obituary: Donald J. Mitchell, September 27, 2003

 

1923 births
2003 deaths
20th-century American politicians
Republican Party members of the United States House of Representatives from New York (state)
Republican Party members of the New York State Assembly
Mayors of places in New York (state)
United States Naval Aviators
United States Navy personnel of World War II
United States Navy personnel of the Korean War
United States Navy pilots of World War II
People of the Cold War
American optometrists
Hobart and William Smith Colleges alumni
Columbia University alumni
People from Herkimer, New York
Philanthropists from New York (state)
20th-century American philanthropists